Rakhi Birla (born 10 June 1987) is an Indian politician serving as Deputy Speaker of Delhi Legislative Assembly. She has served as Cabinet Minister of Women & Child, Social Welfare and Languages in the Government of Delhi. She represents Mangol Puri constituency from Aam Admi Party.

Early life and education
She was born in Delhi. She adopted Birla as her surname when her school administration mistakenly wrote Birla instead of Bidhlan in her class 10th certificate. She was the youngest of four daughters. She did Masters in Mass Communication from NBA School Of Mass Communication, New Delhi. Her family was into social causes for four generations, from her great-grandfather and then grandfather who joined the struggle for India's independence.

Career
She joined a local television channel, Jain T.V., as a trainee reporter after completing her education. She has total 7 months experience of Journalism with Jain TV.

Political career

She came into contact with Arvind Kejriwal during Jan Lokpal Bill movement. She joined Aam Aadmi Party later and contested 2013 Delhi legislative assembly election from Mangolpuri and defeated four times MLA Raj Kumar Chauhan of Indian National Congress. She was sworn in as a Cabinet minister of Women and Child, Social Welfare and Languages in Delhi Government and became the youngest ever Cabinet Minister of Delhi (28 December 2013 to 14 February 2014). She lost to BJP's Udit Raj in the 2014 Lok Sabha election from North West Delhi. Ms. Rakhi Birla was elected as Deputy Speaker of Delhi Legislative Assembly on 10 June 2016. She is the youngest ever Deputy Speaker of Delhi Legislative Assembly.

Positions held
 Cabinet Minister, Women and Child, Social Welfare and Languages (28 December 2013 – 14 February 2014)
 At present, Deputy Speaker, Delhi Vidhan Sabha since 10 June 2016. 
 Chairperson, Committee on Women and Child Development, Petition, Question & Reference 
 Member, National Executive of Aam Aadmi Party and Mla Mangolpuri

See also
 Delhi Government

Electoral performance

References 

 
  

 

Living people
Delhi MLAs 2013–2015
1987 births
Aam Aadmi Party candidates in the 2014 Indian general election
Women members of the Delhi Legislative Assembly
Delhi MLAs 2015–2020
Delhi MLAs 2020–2025
State cabinet ministers of Delhi
Deputy Speakers of the Delhi Legislative Assembly
21st-century Indian women politicians
21st-century Indian politicians
Women state cabinet ministers of India
Aam Aadmi Party MLAs from Delhi